Facta may refer to:

 Fair and Accurate Credit Transactions Act, United States law passed in 2003
 FACTA (magazine), Japanese business journal
 FACTA+, a search engine for biomedical text mining
 Luigi Facta (1861–1930), Italian Prime Minister preceding Mussolini
 Facta (encyclopedia), Finnish encyclopedia
 Federal Anti-Car Theft Act of 1992 (FACTA)

See also 

 Foreign Account Tax Compliance Act (FATCA), United States law passed in 2010